Bob Cooper is an Australian former lightweight rower. He was an Australian national champion and won a bronze medal at the 1978 World Rowing Championships.

Club and state rowing
Raised in Adelaide, Cooper's senior rowing was from the Torrens Rowing Club.

State representation first came for Cooper in 1965 in the South Australian lightweight four contesting the Penrith Cup at the Interstate Regatta within the Australian Rowing Championships. He rowed in further South Australian Penrith Cup crews in 1966, 1967, 1969, 1970, 1971, 1972, 1974, stroking the 1974 South Australian four.  His 1970 crew was victorious breaking the long stranglehold held by Victoria and New South Wales in this event.

In 1966 Cooper rowed in a composite South Australian eight contesting the lightweight eight title at the Australian Championships. In 1968 and again in 1974 in Torrens colours and rowing with Vaughan Bollen, Cooper won the national lightweight coxless pair title at the Australian Rowing Championships.

International representative rowing
Cooper made his sole Australian representative appearance at the 1978 World Rowing Championships in Copenhagen in the Australian men's lightweight eight. That crew won a bronze medal.

Current life
Robert Cooper is now a rowing coach at The Southport School, located on the Gold Coast and predominantly coaches eights. He is currently coaching the TSS Yr 11 1st VIII, rowing in the Jeremy King. The crew is as follows: Macdonald Chandler, Lachlan Frith, Tom Houlahan, Mason King, Toby Goffsassen, Rory Sampson, Sidney Bradnam, George Milson and Cox Samuel Sweetland. Placing 2nd at the annual Head of the River, at Wyaralong Dam with a time of 5:53.49, the crew has been expertly coached by the prestigious Cooper.

References

  

Living people
Australian male rowers
World Rowing Championships medalists for Australia
Year of birth missing (living people)
20th-century Australian people